Rocket Software is a privately held software development firm founded in 1990. Using the IBM Z, IBM Power, and embedded database platforms, Rocket provides predictive analytics with deep data, develop AI and machine learning capabilities, and design mobile and browser applications. Rocket operates in markets including the financial, banking, health care, government, insurance, aerospace, auto manufacturing, and retail industries. Rocket has a business partnership with IBM that began in 1994 with a licensing agreement for Rocket QMF tools. The company is headquartered in Waltham, Massachusetts, USA.

History 
Rocket Software was founded in Boston in 1990 with a focus on IBM DB2 tools.

Rocket's software runs on multiple platforms and operating systems, including mainframe, IBM z/OS, IBM i, UNIX, Windows and other platforms and offers tools to access non-SQL data with standard SQL queries.

In June 2022, Rocket released the latest version of its ASG-Enterprise Orchestrator (AEO) DevOps value stream orchestration platform.

Reception 
Since 2013 when the list was inaugurated, Rocket was included in Database Trends and Applications magazine's annual “DBTA 100,” a list of the companies that matter most in data.

In 2017, former Rocket CEO Andy Youniss was named a New England Entrepreneur of the Year by professional services firm EY. Youniss was also presented the Leadership Award by Boston-based food rescue nonprofit Lovin' Spoonfuls in November 2017.

In December 2017, Rocket was named Ellucian Growth Partner of the Year for providing support to the higher education IT services company in its transition to its current cloud-based service offerings and SaaS licensing model.

In 2020, Rocket was named in Inc.'s list of America's 1,000 Largest and Most Inspiring Private Companies.

In 2021, Rocket acquired the database and tools products of Zumasys including jBASE MultiValue DB

References

External links
 
 Rocket Software at GitHub
 

Software companies based in Massachusetts
Information technology consulting firms of the United States
Data processing
Software companies of the United States
1990 establishments in Massachusetts
Software companies established in 1990
American companies established in 1990